Hellraiser: Best of the Epic Years is a compilation album by the band Motörhead, released in 2003.

Recording
Hellraiser: Best of the Epic Years is spanning the band's two years at Epic Records. The compilation includes songs from the albums 1916 and March ör Die, as well as two non-album tracks that had been on the single "The One to Sing the Blues".

Track List

Personnel
Lemmy – bass, vocals
Würzel – lead guitar
Phil "Wizzö / Zoom" Campbell – rhythm guitar
Phil "Philthy Animal" Taylor –  drums on "The One to Sing the Blues", "Shut You Down", "I Ain't No Nice Guy", "Eagle Rock", "Angel City", "Make My Day", "Going to Brazil", "Dead Man's Hand" & "R.A.M.O.N.E.S."
Tommy Aldridge – drums on "Asylum Choir", "Bad Religion", "You Better Run", "Cat Sratch Fever" & "March ör Die"
with
 Mikkey Dee – drums on "Hellraiser"
 Slash – guitar solo on "I Ain't No Nice Guy" & additional guitar on "You Better Run"
 Ozzy Osbourne – additional vocals on "I Ain't No Nice Guy"

Chart positions

References

External links
 Motorhead official website

2003 greatest hits albums
Motörhead compilation albums